James Alexander Stewart (2 November 1888 – 23 September 1939) was an Australian rules footballer who played with St Kilda in the Victorian Football League (VFL).

Notes

External links 

1888 births
1939 deaths
Australian rules footballers from Victoria (Australia)
St Kilda Football Club players